Brandbu is a former municipality in the old Oppland county, Norway. The  municipality existed from 1897 until its dissolution in 1962. The area is now part of Gran Municipality in the traditional district of Hadeland. The administrative centre was the village of Brandbu. The municipality included land on both sides of the large lake Randsfjorden, although most of the municipal residents lived on the east side of the lake.

History
The municipality of Brandbu was established on 1 January 1897 when the old Gran Municipality was divided. The northern part (population: 4,719) became Brandbu Municipality and the southern part (population: 3,897) remained as Gran Municipality. During the 1960s, there were many municipal mergers across Norway due to the work of the Schei Committee. On 1 January 1962, the municipality of Brandbu (population: 6,477) was merged with most of the municipality of Gran (population: 5,249) to form the new Gran Municipality. Two years later, on 1 January 1964, a small part of the old municipality of Brandbu (population: 12) located along the south shore of the lake Einavatnet was transferred from Gran to Vestre Toten Municipality.

Name
The municipality was named after the old Brandbu farm since this is where the church was located. The first element of the name Brand means "burned" and the last element bú means "house" or "dwelling".

Government
All municipalities in Norway, including Brandbu, are responsible for primary education (through 10th grade), outpatient health services, senior citizen services, unemployment and other social services, zoning, economic development, and municipal roads. The municipality was governed by a municipal council of elected representatives, which in turn elected a mayor.

Municipal council
The municipal council  of Brandbu was made up of 25 representatives that were elected to four year terms.  The party breakdown of the final municipal council was as follows:

Mayor
The mayors of Brandbu (incomplete list):
1945-1945: Thorvald Ulsnæs (Ap)
1946-1961: Jens Røisli (Ap)

See also
List of former municipalities of Norway

References

Gran, Norway
Former municipalities of Norway
1897 establishments in Norway
1962 disestablishments in Norway